The Niuweidao was a type of Chinese saber (dao) of the late Qing Dynasty period. A heavy bladed weapon with a characteristic flaring tip, it was primarily a civilian weapon, as Imperial troops were never issued it.

References
 
 

Chinese swords
Blade weapons